Bottom of the 9th is a baseball game by Konami for the PlayStation, which was later ported to the Sega Saturn and the Nintendo 64. It is a heavily updated version of Konami's 1989 arcade game Bottom of the Ninth. The game is part of Konami's XXL Sports brand.

Gameplay
One of the earliest in Konami'''s franchise, this version features 300 actual MLB players, but does not feature the MLB licensed teams. Players can choose to either play against a friend in Exhibition, Season or Playoffs. The gameplay is geared for more of a simulation style of play with the players stats determining on how well they hit, pitch and field.

Along with the standard modes for a baseball game, this one also features the ability to customize teams and choose any player to create a "Dream Team". It also has a variety of different camera angles, a "Streak Bar" that shows a batter's hitting ability, and a "Pitching Bar" that shows whether a pitcher is fatigued.

ReceptionBottom of the 9th received mixed reviews. Critics commented that the screen is too cluttered with info, the graphics in general are below average, and the controls (particularly the unusual batting system) are difficult to get a handle on. However, critics for Next Generation and GamePro felt the controls and steep challenge of the game ultimately make it more realistic, and that mastering the unusual controls ultimately pays off with a deeper gaming experience, with Air Hendrix of GamePro concluding that "Serious baseball fiends will enjoy this ballpark's authentic, challenging gameplay". The two sports reviewers of Electronic Gaming Monthly instead argued that the steep learning curve makes Bottom of the 9th'' less worthwhile than more immediately accessible games.

Air Hendrix described the Saturn version as "an impressively exact port ... with both the flaws (quirky graphics and tricky controls) and high points (excellent gameplay) of the original." He noted that despite the fact that the 1996 baseball season had started, the Saturn version had not updated the rosters.

Notes

References

External links

1996 video games
Konami games
Major League Baseball video games
Multiplayer and single-player video games
Nintendo 64 games
PlayStation (console) games
Sega Saturn games
Video game remakes
Video games developed in Japan